Herbert T. Schumann, Jr. is an American politician who formerly served as a Cook County commissioner from 1990 to 2002.

Early life and education
Schumann was born in either 1951 or 1952.

Shumann's father, Herb Schumann Sr., was one of the incorporators of Palos Hills, Illinois and was, for 18 years until his 1990 death, a Palos Township supervisor.

Schumann earned a Bachelor of Arts from Governors State University. Schumann then earned a Master of Business Administration in finance from DePaul University.

Career
From 1974 to 1977, Schumann served as a trustee of Moraine Valley Community College.

In 1982, Schumann ran unsuccessfully for the Cook County Board of Commissioners.

From 1986 through 2002, he served as Palos Township Republican committeeman chairing the Palos Township Republican Organization, and having been elected in 1986, 1990, 1994, and 1998.

In 1992, he was the Republican nominee for Clerk of the Circuit Court of Cook County, losing the election to Democrat Aurelia Pucinski.

He served for a time as the Chairman of the Cook County Republican Party.

Cook County Board of Commissioners
From 1990 through 2002, Shumann served as Cook County commissioner. He was appointed in 1990 as a member from suburban Cook County, filling the vacancy left by the death in office of Harold Tyrrell. He was reelected in 1990. In 1994, when the board switched to single-member districts, he was elected to represent the 17th district. He was subsequently reelected in 1998. In 2002 he lost reelection in the Republican primary to Elizabeth Ann Doody Gorman. During his campaign against Gorman, he had criticized her connections with Edward Vrdolyak, while she criticized him for "voting with" board president John Stroger.

In 1991, he and president of the Cook County Board of Commissioners Richard Phelan proposed a plan to levy a tax on non-hazardous solid waste accepted by landfill operators.

In 1992, he and three other Republican suburban Cook County commissioners filed a lawsuit to stop board president Richard Phelan's executive order to allow elective abortions at county hospitals.

He and Maria Pappas were the only two members to vote against the districting map adopted when the Board of Commissioners switched to single-member districts in 1994.

During part of his tenure, he chaired the board's environment committee.

Ahead of the 1993 township elections in Palos Township, he partnered with some Democrats to form the Palos Township Independent Party. The party would, in the following years, see success in township elections.

During part of his tenure on the Cook County Board of Commissioners, he served as a member of the Northeastern Illinois Planning Commission appointed by the County Board. This included serving as the commission's president.

Later career
After losing his seat, he began working many years as a finance director under president of the Cook County Board of Commissioners John Stroger and his successors Bobbie L. Steele and Todd Stroger.

Schumann worked as a property tax analyst employed by the Cook County Board of Review.

Schumann served on the Palos Lions Cal Sag Watershed Council.

In 2014, Schumann ran unsuccessfully for a seat on the Water Reclamation District of Greater Chicago board.

In 2016, Schumann ran unsuccessfully for the seat on the Water Reclamation District of Greater Chicago board vacated when Patrick Daley Thompson resigned to assume office as a Chicago alderman. The seat had been filled with an interim appointment by Governor Bruce Rauner of Republican David J. Walsh, however Walsh did not seek reelection and Schumann had won the Republican nomination unopposed. He received the endorsements of the Chicago Sun-Times and Chicago Tribune in the general election.

Personal life
Schumann and his wife Colleen have a son named Lucas and daughter named Mackenzi. When he first joined the Cook County Board of Commissioners in 1990, he resided in Palos Hills, Illinois. , he lived in Palos Heights, Illinois.

Schumann's wife Colleen Schumann has served as a Palos Township supervisor since 2005.

Electoral history

Cook County Board of Commissioners

1982

1990

1994

1998

2002

Palos Township Republican Committeeman

Clerk of the Circuit Court of Cook County
1992

Metropolitan Water Reclamation District of Greater Chicago board
2014

2016

References

Members of the Cook County Board of Commissioners
Illinois Republicans
Governors State University alumni
DePaul University alumni
People from Palos Heights, Illinois
People from Palos Hills, Illinois
1950s births
Living people